Joseph Hargreaves (1821 – 10 April 1880) was a 19th-century Member of Parliament from Auckland, New Zealand.

Born in Liverpool in 1821, Hargreaves represented the  electorate in 1860, from 5 April (elected in the electorate's second by-election that year) to 24 July, when he resigned on private grounds. John Logan Campbell was elected unopposed (in the electorate's third by-election that year) to fill the vacancy. He died on 10 April 1880.

Hargreaves was married to a daughter of William Spain, who had been appointed in 1841 as a New Zealand Land Claims Commissioner and had lived in the country until 1845. His wife died on 2 October 1910, aged 84.

Footnotes

References

1821 births
1880 deaths
Members of the New Zealand House of Representatives
New Zealand MPs for Auckland electorates
19th-century New Zealand politicians